Browder may refer to:

People

Andrew Browder (1931–2019), American mathematician
Aurelia Browder (1919–1971), African-American civil rights activist
Ben Browder (born 1962), American actor and writer
Bill Browder (born 1964), Hermitage Capital Management CEO and Vladimir Putin critic
Dustin Browder, American executive at Blizzard Entertainment
Earl Browder (1891–1973), Chairman of the Communist Party, USA from 1934 to 1945
Felix Browder (1927–2016), United States mathematician
Glen Browder (born 1943), Alabama politician
Joe Browder (1938–2016), American environmental activist
 Joshua Browder (born 1997), British-American founder of DoNotPay
Kalief Browder (1993–2015), African-American jailed for three years as a teen for robbery before his case was dismissed
Nick Browder (born 1975), former US Arena football quarterback
William Browder (mathematician) (born 1934), American topology mathematician

Other
Browder, Kentucky, an unincorporated community in Muhlenberg County